Alexandru Popa (born July 12, 1968) is a Romanian sprint canoer who competed in the early 1990s. At the 1992 Summer Olympics in Barcelona, he was eliminated in the semifinals of the K-2 1000 m event.

References
Sports-Reference.com profile

1968 births
Canoeists at the 1992 Summer Olympics
Living people
Olympic canoeists of Romania
Romanian male canoeists
Place of birth missing (living people)